Erythraeus berninensis is a species of mite belonging to the family Erythraeidae. It belongs to the group of species that has a basifemoral, setal formula 3-3-3.

References

Further reading
Xue, Xiao-feng, and Zhi-qiang Zhang. "An analysis of and index to new Acari described in Systematic & Applied Acarology (1996–2007)." Systematic & Applied Acarology 13 (2008): 279-304.
KAMRAN, MUHAMMAD. Systematics of larval Erythraeidae (Acarina) of Punjab, Pakistan. Diss. DEPARTMENT OF AGRI. ENTOMOLGY FACULTY OF AGRICULTURE, UNIVERSITY OF AGRICULTURE, FAISALABAD, 2009.

Trombidiformes
Animals described in 2007
Arachnids of Europe